The Yamaha FZ6, also known as the FZ6 FAZER is a  motorcycle that was introduced by Yamaha in 2004 as a middleweight street bike built around the 2003 YZF-R6 engine. The engine is retuned for more usable midrange power. As a multi-purpose motorcycle it can handle sport riding, touring, and commuting. In 2010, the FZ6 was replaced by the fully faired FZ6R in North America, and the XJ6 Diversion, XJ6 N and XJ6 Diversion F in Europe. The FZ6 styling was continued in 2011 with the Yamaha FZ8 and FAZER8.

This bike is a popular choice for its half-fairing, upright seating position, and underseat exhaust. These features position it between a full supersport and a naked streetfighter (although in Europe and Australia, there is an available naked FZ6N option).

Model history

2006 revision
The FZ6 in 2006 has a revised engine, frame, subframe, grabhandle, rear swingarm and wheels are painted in black. It had a metal honeycomb type catalytic converter satisfies EU2 and CARB emissions standards, and optimized fuel injection (FI) system mapping to increase torque at lower engine speeds.

2007 revision
In October 2006, Yamaha announced an updated FZ6 for the 2007 model year.
The FZ6 received optimized fuel injection (FI) system mapping, redesigned fairing and windscreen, new instrument cluster with analog tachometer and digital speedometer (similar to the FZ1), new four-piston monoblock brake calipers for the front brake, alumite-finished front forks with revised damping, a three-way catalytic converter, a new seat design, a new rear swingarm, and new passenger footpegs.

2008 revision
The 2008 model is technically unchanged from 2007. The only difference is in appearance of  front cowling around the headlights, which is now black regardless of motorcycle color. The European model 'FZ6 Fazer S2 ABS' has ABS and electronic immobilizer as standard.

2009 revision
The 2009 model (introduced on September 8, 2008) is technically unchanged from 2008/2007, besides the optional more comfortable seat becoming standard.

2010 revision
For the 2010 model year, Yamaha continued to sell the FZ6 Fazer S2 (half-faired) and FZ6 S2 (naked) in Europe. Both have full power (98 PS) and ABS.

Reduced power models have been discontinued and replaced with the XJ6 with optional ABS. In North America, the fully faired XJ6 Diversion F, having no ABS and electronic immobilizer, is known as FZ6R and replaces the FZ6 in its second season on the market.

Specifications

FZ6N
The FZ6N is virtually identical to the standard FZ6 Fazer model with the exception of not having the half-fairing fitted

References

External links
Motorcycle USA 2004 FZ6 bike test
Review of Motorcycle News 2004 FZ6 road test
Motorcycle Consumer News 2004 FZ6 Review
American Motorcyclist 2006 FZ6 review
Rider Magazine 2007 FZ6 road test

FZ6
Standard motorcycles
Motorcycles introduced in 2004